St. Luke's Episcopal Church is a historic Episcopal church at 346 High Street in Hope Township in Warren County, New Jersey. It was built in 1839 and added to the National Register of Historic Places in 2007.

The church is administered by the Episcopal Church of St. Luke and St. Mary, formed by the January 2016 merger of the former parish of St. Luke's with St. Mary's in Belvidere.

See also
 National Register of Historic Places listings in Warren County, New Jersey

References

External links
 Episcopal Church of St. Luke and St. Mary

19th-century Episcopal church buildings
Churches completed in 1839
Churches in Warren County, New Jersey
Episcopal church buildings in New Jersey
Gothic Revival church buildings in New Jersey
Hope Township, New Jersey
National Register of Historic Places in Warren County, New Jersey
Churches on the National Register of Historic Places in New Jersey
New Jersey Register of Historic Places
Religious organizations established in 1828